How It Ends is the fourth album from the band DeVotchKa, released by Cicero Recordings, Ltd. in 2004.  The song "How It Ends" reached Number 101 in the UK Singles Chart.

Track listing
 "You Love Me" – 4:02
 "The Enemy Guns" – 4:21
 "No One Is Watching" – 0:25
 "Twenty-Six Temptations" – 4:12
 "How It Ends" – 6:59
 "Charlotte Mittnacht (The Fabulous Destiny of...)" – 3:06
 "We're Leaving" – 4:42
 "Dearly Departed" – 5:12
 "Such a Lovely Thing"  – 4:40
 "Too Tired" – 4:00
 "Viens Avec Moi" – 5:01
 "This Place Is Haunted" – 3:19
 "Lunnaya Pogonka" – 5:18
 "Reprise" – 1:45

References

External links
Official website

2004 albums
DeVotchKa albums